Loon Lake is a  lake north of Cache Creek in British Columbia, Canada, and is part of the "Land of Hidden Waters".

In July 2017 some of the resort areas were damaged by wildfires.

Geography 

Loon Lake in the Bonaparte Plateau (there are eight other Loon Lakes in B.C.) is located in a steep valley between Bonaparte Plateau to the north and west and the Arrowstone Hills to the south and east on the larger Thompson Plateau. The north side consists mainly of Douglas Fir and Ponderosa Pine mixed with lesser amounts of poplar, alder and common mountain juniper. The south side of Loon Lake is composed mainly of Engelmann Spruce and Douglas fir.

The entire length of the west shore has been developed with resorts, permanent homes and summer residences. There are approximately 50 cabins as well on the east shore accessible only by water, with no power or phone connections. Some of the cabins were damaged or destroyed by a forest fire in July 2017. There is a ranch at the northeast end and a First Nations reserve to the southwest (Bonaparte no 4). There are approximately 200 permanent residents year-round with the population swelling to over 1000 in peak holiday periods. Many families have owned summer homes on Loon Lake for three or four generations. Local government is provided by the Thompson Nicola Regional District, local policing is from Clinton and the closest hospital is at Ashcroft.

Travelers can reach Loon Lake off of Highway 97 about 20 km north of Cache Creek and traveling through the Bonaparte valley and Loon Creek valley to arrive at Loon Lake 18 km in from Highway turnoff.

Loon Lake is a long, narrow, deep and clear lake. The shoal area extends out into the lake for about 5 meters (16.4 ft.) and then drops off quickly. The shoal area contains sedge and bulrushes. Dense stands of coniferous forest mixed with small stands of deciduous growth with some rock outcroppings comprise the immediate shoreline surrounding the south shore of the lake.

Facilities
The services at the lake include eight resorts with stores, boat rentals, gas and propane, RV parking and camping. A few resorts offer wireless Internet connection. There is a public boat launch at the east end of the lake.

The oldest still operating resort is the Evergreen Resort at the west end of the lake established in the mid 1930s, followed soon after in 1938 by the establishment of Loon Lake Resort by Ed and Pearl Dougherty and the White Moose by N. Fowler.

Loon Lake is also the base location for trips up into Hihium Lake.

Fishing 
Loon Lake supports rainbow trout fishery up to 1.5 kg. Many freshwater shrimp, dragon flies, nymphs, chironomids and may flies make this a good fly-fishing lake, however, trolling with flatfish and spinning lures are the most popular methods used on the lake.

References

External links 
 BCAdventure.com, Loon Lake Information
 Marigold Fishing Resort
 Evergreen Fishing Resort
 White Moose Resort

Lakes of British Columbia
Resorts in Canada
Lillooet Land District